(born September 28, 1992) is a retired Japanese artistic gymnast. She is the 2009 World all-around bronze medalist, uneven bars silver medalist, and a two-time Olympian (2008, 2012).

Gymnastics career 
Tsurumi was a member of the 2008 Japanese Olympic Team. The women's gymnastics team placed 5th in team competition. Individually, Tsurumi placed 17th in the all-around final and 8th in the balance beam event final.

Tsurumi competed at the 2009 American Cup and placed 7th all-around.

At the 2009 World Championships in London, Koko Tsurumi competed a historic performance to win the individual all-around bronze medal. During event finals, Tsurumi won the silver medal on uneven bars and placed 6th on balance beam. Tsurumi is the first Japanese woman gymnast to win a World Championships medal in 43 years.

Koko competed at the 2010 Japan Cup and placed second all-around behind Ksenia Afanasyeva. At that competition, Tsurumi scored a 15.400 on uneven bars. She debuted a new bars routine with an ono turn to half turn connected to a Tkachev and an ono turn connected to a Jaegar.
At the 2010 World Artistic Gymnastics Championships, Tsurumi experienced problems with consistency and failed to make any event finals and placed 21st in the All Around, behind countrywoman Rie Tanaka.

At the 2011 Japan Cup, Koko placed 2nd place with the Japanese team in the team competition and won the gold medal in the all around competition.  She placed 0.100 higher than 2nd-place finisher, Chinese gymnast Sui Lu.  Later that year she placed seventh on Uneven Bars at the World Championships and seventh with the team.

In 2012, Koko was part of Japan's Olympic team in London, where she placed seventh in the bars final and eighth with the team.

She made her elite comeback at the 2015 WOGA Classic in Plano, Texas, scoring 15.000 on bars and 13.850 on beam.

At the NHK Cup, Tsurumi suffered an achilles tendon injury and was out for the remainder of the 2015 season. She retired in 2015.

Competitive history

Senior

References

External links
 
 
 

1992 births
Living people
Japanese female artistic gymnasts
Medalists at the World Artistic Gymnastics Championships
Gymnasts at the 2008 Summer Olympics
Gymnasts at the 2012 Summer Olympics
Olympic gymnasts of Japan
Asian Games medalists in gymnastics
Gymnasts at the 2010 Asian Games
Asian Games silver medalists for Japan
Asian Games bronze medalists for Japan
Medalists at the 2010 Asian Games
Gymnasts from Tokyo
21st-century Japanese women